Faraaz is a masculine given name. Notable people with the name include:

Faraaz Ayaaz Hossain (1996–2016), Bangladeshi crime victim
Faraaz Khan (born 1974), Indian film actor

Arts and entertainment
 Faraaz (2022 film), a Hindi film on actual event

See also

Faraz

Masculine given names